John Furley (24 March 1847 – 30 June 1909) was an English first-class cricketer.

Furley was born at Oakham in March 1847, where he was educated at Oakham School. He made two appearances in first-class cricket. His first appearance came for the North in the North v South fixture of 1875 at Loughborough, with his second appearance coming for an England XI against Gloucestershire at The Oval in 1877. He captained Oakham and Burghley Park Cricket Club.

Furley was a wine and spirit merchant on High Street, Oakham. He died suddenly at Oakham in June 1909.

References

External links

1847 births
1909 deaths
People from Oakham
People educated at Oakham School
English cricketers
North v South cricketers
Non-international England cricketers
Cricketers from Rutland